Phenylobacterium panacis is a Gram negative and rod-shaped  bacterium from the genus of Phenylobacterium which has been isolated from the rhizosphere of a ginseng plant from the Hwacheon mountain in Korea.

References

External links
Type strain of Phenylobacterium panacis at BacDive -  the Bacterial Diversity Metadatabase

Caulobacterales
Bacteria described in 2016